The 1988 Olympics, saw the introduction of Lechner Division II boards. The Division II class used a 6.5 m sail and were round bottomed boards designed for upwind sailing in light to moderate winds.

The contest for the Olympic board had been between the Davidson (a Swedish design) and the Lechner built in Austria. The final Olympic rig was available less than a year before the Olympics. 

Like in 1984, the supplied equipment was rotated daily (except for the rigs).

References 

 
Olympic sailing classes
Windsurfing equipment